Shakir Shujabadi is a prominent Saraiki-language poet (born 25 February 1954) in Shujabad, a small city near Multan, Pakistan . In 2007, he received his first presidential award. In 2017, he received his second presidential award. His first proper Mushaira was held in 1986.

See also
 Ashu Lal Faqeer

References

Living people
1954 births
Pakistani people with disabilities
Saraiki-language poets
Saraiki people